Alwyn North is a major oil and gas field in the United Kingdom sector of the northern North Sea, 160 km east of the Shetland Islands. The field was developed through two bridge-linked offshore platforms and a number of subsea satellite wellheads. Alwyn North has been producing oil and gas since 1987 and is still (2021) in operation.

The field 
The field was discovered in June 1975 principally in Block 3/9a of the northern North Sea with a small extension into Block 3/4a. The reservoir is a Jurassic sandstone, comprising a Brent (oil) formation at a depth of 3,100 m and a Statfjord (gas) formation at 3,400 m. The estimated recoverable oil is 200 million barrels and recoverable gas is 27 billion cubic metres. The oil has an API gravity of 39° and a sulfur content of 0.5%. The name Alwyn has Scottish connotations and can be easily pronounced in English and French – the French operator Is Total.

Development 
The Alwyn North field was developed by a joint venture comprising Elf Exploration UK plc (66.66 %) and Total Oil Marine plc (33.33%). The field was initially developed by two bridge-linked offshore platforms: the drilling platform NAA and a production platform NAB. Key parameters of the platforms are:

Oil and gas processing 
The process plant has an oil treatment capacity of 99,000 stock tank barrels per day and a gas handling capacity of 9 million cubic metres per day. Oil from the NAA oil wells is routed across the bridge to the oil separator, where vapour and water are removed, oil then flows to the oil dehydrator where more water is removed and through the export pumps to the Ninian Central installation via a 16 km 12-inch pipeline, and from there to the Sullom Voe terminal. Gas from the gas wellheads flows to the gas condensate separator and is then comingled with compressed off-gas from the oil plant. The combined flow is then routed to the glycol-based gas dehydration system to reduce the water dewpoint. Gas is then refrigerated using Freon to remove liquids, gas flows to Frigg TP1 installation via a 112 km 24-inch gas export line. Liquids removed in the gas plant are routed to the inlet of the oil separator.

Produced water from the oil train separators is treated to remove oil prior to overboard discharge. The oily water system has a capacity of 100,000 barrels per day. 

Filtered and deoxygenated seawater is injected into the reservoir to assist with production, the plant is designed to treat and inject 130,000 barrels of water per day.

The peak oil production was 4.36 million tonnes per year in 1989; the peak gas production was 2.8 billion m3 (in 1989).

Gas injection commenced in late 1999 into the Brent East-South area then from September 2000 into the Brent North West area. By mid 2002 1.68 Gsm3 of gas had been injected. This increased oil production in four wells between a 2 to 10 fold.

Satellite fields 
The subsea wellheads from the Nuggets (Northern Underwater Gas Gathering Export and Treatment System), Forvie, Islay and Jura fields are routed to Alwyn North for fluid processing.

References 

North Sea energy
North Sea
Oil fields of Scotland
Oil fields of the United Kingdom